Constantin Senlecq (Fauquembergues, 1842 – Ardres, 1934)  was a French scientist and inventor who is credited with the invention of telectroscope. He worked independently of the American  inventor George R. Carey, who came up with a similar idea at approximately the same time ( 1877–1880) .
Telectroscope was the first prototype television. It used the photoconductive properties of selenium to transmit image .

References
 Constantin SENLECQ, Le télectroscope, Typographie D'Homont, Saint-Omer, 1881. 

French physicists
French inventors
Television pioneers
1842 births
1934 deaths